"Mama Used to Say" is the debut single release by the British R&B recording artist Junior, taken from his debut studio album Ji.

Formats and track listings
12" vinyl
"Mama Used to Say" – 6:40 	
"Mama Used to Say" (Instrumental) – 6:05 	
"Mama Used to Say" (English Party Mix) – 4:56

7" vinyl
"Mama Used to Say" (American Remix) – 3:35
"Mama Used to Say" (American Instrumental Mix) – 4:35

Charts
"Mama Used to Say" was released in April 1982 and reached the UK Singles Chart top 10 in June 1982, where it remained at #7 for two weeks. It was also a Top 40 hit and in the United States, earning Junior a Best Newcomer award from Billboard magazine. The song was ranked at #6 among the top 10 tracks of the year for 1981 by NME.

Weekly charts

Beverley Knight version

British singer-songwriter Beverley Knight released "Mama Used to Say" on 27 June 2011 as the first single release from her seventh studio album, Soul UK, a tribute to UK soul artists.

Background
Knight said of the song, "I think this was everyone's favourite track at the time and is still played on every 'club classics' radio show in the country. It's still so fresh and just brings a smile whenever I sing it. It was an obvious choice for the album and a no-brainer for the choice of first single."

Track listing
Digital download
 "Mama Used to Say" (Radio Version) – 3:01	  	
 "Mama Used to Say" (Album Version) – 3:51 	  	
 "Mama Used to Say" (Dave Doyle Extended Club Mix) – 7:42 	  	
 "Mama Used to Say" (Cool Million's Boogie Down 12 Mix) – 5:36
 "Mama Used to Say" (Cool Million's Boogie Down Mix) – 4:09
 "Mama Used to Say" (Live) – 4:36

Music video
The music video for "Mama Used to Say" premiered on Knight's YouTube page on 23 May 2011. The video features both performance and behind-the-scenes footage from her April 2011 album launch show at London's Porchester Hall, soundtracked to the album version of the song. The video features cameos by Junior, Jaki Graham, Rod Temperton and Jazzie B.

Release history

Other uses
British comedian and rapper Richard Blackwood (Junior's nephew) sampled "Mama Used to Say" on his debut single "Mama – Who Da Man", which peaked at #3 on the UK Singles Chart in 2000.
The song's guitar intro was sampled for Positive K's hit "I Got a Man".
Rapper Mac sampled the song on "Slow Ya Roll" from his album Shell Shocked.
Rapper Heavy D of Heavy D & the Boyz sampled "Mama Used to Say" for the song "Is It Good to You" from the album Peaceful Journey.
Rapper Warren G sampled the song for his "Do You See" single from his "Regulate... G Funk Era" album released in late 1994. 
The rap group Bone Thugs-n-Harmony sampled the song for their single "Thuggish Ruggish Bone" from their 1994 debut EP Creepin on ah Come Up.
The song is featured in the video game NBA 2K15.

References

1982 debut singles
Junior Giscombe songs
2011 singles
Beverley Knight songs
1981 songs
Mercury Records singles